Saša Vlaisavljević (born April 27, 1968, in Bihać, SR Bosnia-Herzegovina, SFR Yugoslavia) is a CEO and the President of Executive Board of Belgrade Nikola Tesla Airport He is a Serbian engineer, business executive, and a politician.

Vlaisavljević obtained his transport engineering degree from the University of Belgrade's Faculty of Transport, at the Air Traffic department. Also he is holding a degree of the Faculty of Traffic Sciences of University in Zagreb.

Career

Jat Airways
He started working at Jat Airways, Serbian flag carrier, in 1995. He soon rose to the position of sector chief and later ground control director. On October 31, 2007, Serbian government named him to the post of Jat Airways CEO (generalni direktor). Early on in his leadership of the airline, Vlaisavljevi benefited from the positive business outcomes he inherited in terms of passenger growth, allowing Jat to end the year 2007 with a profit and 1.3 million passengers transported, its best results since the year 1990. He also presided over three new destination additions: Oslo, as well as Pula and Thessaloniki during 2008 summer season.

However, the privatization efforts were ultimately unsuccessful despite some public interest from Aeroflot and Air India. The privatization tender was opened on July 31, 2008, by the Serbian Government's Privatization Agency with a starting price for 51% stake set at US$51 million. Prospective buyers could buy from 51% up to 70% stake in the company. But, until the tender's closing date on September 26, 2008, no one submitted an offer. As a result, Serbian Government decided to restructure the company, rather than calling another tender with a lower starting price.

Earlier, in March 2008, Vlaisavljević estimated Jat's fleet to be worth around US$100–120 million. He also mentioned on the same occasion that the amount owed to Jat by other parties (MAT Macedonian Airlines, Nigerian Sosoliso Airlines, unused advance paid to Airbus, General Sales Agent for Middle Eastern destinations, etc.) adds up to a combined US$50 million. Among the additional assets in company's ownership, he listed 14 slots at London's Heathrow Airport as well as slots at other European airports. On the other hand, he confirmed Jat's debt to be around US$209 million.

Overall, calendar year 2008 was very bad for Jat with an annual posted loss of US$80 million, mostly because of high fuel prices and decreased passenger loads during the 2008-09 global financial crisis.

City of Belgrade
In early July 2009, Vlaisavljević started working for the City of Belgrade administration as their city manager, answering directly to mayor Dragan Đilas. Đilas actually hired him in late 2008, but Vlaisavljević remained at Jat for another 6 months due to the company's ongoing restructuring effort at the time following its failed privatization attempt amidst the 2008-2009 global financial crisis. He resigned after only after three weeks in office due to personal dispute with mayor Dragan Đilas.

Serbian Chamber of commerce
In December 2009, he was appointed a Vice President of Serbian Chamber of Commerce' and Industry of Serbia (abbr. CCIS or PKS). He remained in the position of Vice president until 2013, when he became its director. During his work in Serbian Chamber of Commerce, he gained experience that gives a completely new dimension to the development path of each manager. That experience enabled him, after returning to the domain of responsibility for one system, to start looking at it far more broadly.

Belgrade Nikola Tesla Airport
After the successful work in Serbian Chamber of Commerce, in 2014 he took over Belgrade Nikola Tesla Airport or Belgrade Airport . Under his leadership, the airport records the best years of business development (2014-2018). The value of the airport has increased from € 200m to € 1.5 billion, while the number of passengers has increased by more than a million passengers. More than 10 new airlines have started flights from Belgrade. The net profit of airport every year, starting from 2014 and ending in 2018, was over € 25 million. The increase in net profit was about 200 times higher compared to the one in 2013.

The period from 2013 is the most successful business period since the establishment of Nikola Tesla Belgrade Airport. Only 5 years ago, the capacity of Nikola Tesla Belgrade Airport was not sufficient to serve the 5.3 million passengers recorded in the record 2017. Infrastructure investments have increased the capacity to receive and dispatch passengers from 5 to 7.5 million passengers annually.
Owing to excellent business results and a profit of more than 120 million euros in the last 4.5 years, since 2014, more than € 85 million have been invested in the development of infrastructure, technology and capacity from our own funds, without credit borrowing and interference on regular air traffic operation. With outstanding business results, we have increased the value of the Airport's share 5 times since 2013, while the value of ANT has increased by several hundred million €.

During the 2018 summer season, passengers were offered regular and charter flights by 39 airlines operating from Belgrade to 96 destinations in 37 countries in Europe, the United States, the Middle and Far East and North Africa.
Belgrade Airport is the first airport in the region to re-establish regular intercontinental flights, and the only one in the region to have long-haul traffic to both America and China, as a result of China's strong economic ties with Serbia.

Nikola Tesla Airport
The Republic of Serbia, represented by the Government of the Republic of Serbia and Nikola Tesla Airport Belgrade, during 2017, conducted a procedure aimed at granting concessions for financing, development through construction and reconstruction, maintenance and management of the infrastructure of the airport and performing the activities of the airport operator (hereinafter referred to as "Concession").

On March 22, 2018, the Concession Agreement on Financing, Development through Construction and Reconstruction, Maintenance and Management of the Infrastructure of AD Nikola Tesla Airport Belgrade was concluded and the activities of the Airport Operator at the Nikola Tesla Airport in Belgrade, between the Republic of Serbia, represented by the Government of the Republic of Serbia and AD Nikola Tesla Airport Belgrade, on the one hand, as Concession Provider and VINCI Airports Serbia doo Belgrade, a legal entity established in accordance with the laws of the Republic of Serbia.

Bearing in mind that the contracting parties fulfilled all the requirements during the transitional period, the certificate of the airport was transferred from Nikola Tesla Airport Belgrade to Vinci Airports Serbia Ltd. Belgrade and the concession started on December 22, 2018. This led to a change in the predominant activity and composition of the managing bodies of airport.

Other business activities
 From 2019 - A member of a Council of Faculty of Transport and Traffic Engineering
 From 2018 - A member of the presidency of Serbian Association of Employers
 From 2018 - Vice President of Basketball club Crvena Zvezda
 From 2018 - President of the Assembly of the Water polo Association of Serbia
 From 2016 - A member of Association of Corporate Directors of Serbia
 From 2014 - A president of Financial Commission of Chamber of Commerce and Industry of Serbia

Award and recognition

Personal awards

Airport awards
Under the leadership of Saša Vlaisavljević, AD Belgrade Nikola Tesla Airport has won numerous international, regional and domestic awards for business success:

References

External links

 https://www.bizlife.rs/biznis/poslovne-vesti/71709-vlaisavljevic-direktor-aerodroma/
 https://www.kamatica.com/vest/aerodrom-nikola-tesla-ostvario-rekordnu-dobit-u-2014/16433
 https://playtravel.rs/vesti/zanimljivosti/aerodrom-nikola-tesla-beograd-uspesno-u-2015

1968 births
Living people
KK Crvena Zvezda executives
People from Bihać
Serbian businesspeople
Serbs of Bosnia and Herzegovina
University of Belgrade alumni